Russell Ginns is a game designer, writer,  and composer, primarily known for children's fiction, puzzles, and educational games and songs.  He is the author of more than 100 books, including Super Atomic Wombat Girl, Puzzlooies, 1-2-3 Scream! and the Samantha Spinner series.  He has created or contributed to several notable software titles, including Castle Infinity, Hooked on Phonics, Reader Rabbit and Half-Life.

Publishing 

Ginns worked as an editor for Sesame Street Magazine, 3-2-1 Contact, and The Electric Company. He created the Nintendo Adventure Books series. and several dozen puzzle books, choose-your-own-adventure books, and young adult fiction. Titles include Puzzlooney!, Go Figure, Midnight Science!, and The Big Book of Kids' Puzzles. Ginns created more than 100 workbooks for Sylvan Learning, including Third Grade Math Super Success and Fifth Grade Basic Math Success. He wrote 76 leveled reader books  for the Hooked on Phonics Learn to Read program.

Between 2013 and 2015, Ginns wrote four collections of board books (The Little Box of Love; The Little Box of Laughs; The Little Box of Bedtime; and The Little Box of Classics) for Houghton Mifflin Harcourt. This series includes Is There a Chance You’ve Seen My Pants?, Bird on My Head, and Monster Love.

In 2017, Random House published the first title in Ginns's book series, Samantha Spinner and the Super-Secret Plans. He wrote My Big Book of Feelings for Rodale Press in 2020. His graphic novel series Super Atomic Wombat Girl will launch in fall 2023 with illustrations by Jay Cooper. He is the creator and co-author of "Puzzlooies," a hybrid puzzle-story book format, combining silly stories with interactive puzzles that advance the plot. The initial launch featured twelve titles, including Marooned on the Moon, One of Our Giant Robots Is Missing, and Space Cats to the Rescue.  His 2022 title 1-2-3 Scream! is an anthology of humorous horror stories.

Ginns has also been published under the names Clyde Bosco, P. C. Russell Ginns, Jacques Barniarde, Kravis Winewater, Hans Shingle, and R. U. Ginns.

Games and interactive media 
Ginns was the lead designer of  Castle Infinity, the first MMORPG for kids. He has also contributed to titles including Half-Life, Hooked on Phonics, and Lode Runner.

He has created toys and software products for Sesame Street including Sesame Street Countdown, Let's Make a Word, and the Sesame Street Learning Series.

Ginns has worked as a designer/producer with several independent game publishers, developing titles that include Crop Circles, Pop! The Balloon Dog Puzzle Game, and AlphaNatix., Thud!, Mercury Messenger, and Smart Kart.

His published board games include Wordspot, Schmear, Search Party, and Chess on the Loose.

Bibliography

 1991: Super Mario Bros. Double Trouble 
 1991: Super Mario Bros. Leaping Lizards 
 1994: Go Figure! Puzzles, Puns, and Funny Figures of Speech 
 1995: Puzzlooney! 
 1996: Midnight Science 
 2009: Chick-Chick the Ping-Pong Champ ISBN 978-1940384146
 2013: Is There a Chance You've Seen My Pants? 
 2014: Bird On My Head 
 2014: Monster Love 
 2016: Samantha Spinner and the Super-secret Plans 
 2017: Samantha Spinner and the Spectacular Specs 
 2018: Samantha Spinner and the Boy in the Ball 
 2019: My Big Book of Feelings 
 2020: One of Our Giant Robots Is Missing 
 2020: The Last Donut 
 2021: Marooned on the Moon 
 2021: Don't Feed Fluffy! 
 2022: 1-2-3 Scream!

References

External links 

American game designers
American male writers
American songwriters
Living people
Year of birth missing (living people)